Joseph H. Young (July 18, 1922 – March 14, 2015) was a United States district judge of the United States District Court for the District of Maryland.

Education and career

Born in Hagerstown, Maryland, Young was an infantryman in the United States Army during World War II, from 1942 to 1946. He received an Artium Baccalaureus degree from Dartmouth College in 1948 and a Bachelor of Laws from the University of Virginia School of Law in 1951. He was in private practice in Baltimore, Maryland, from 1951 to 1971, and was an instructor at Johns Hopkins University from 1954 to 1964.

Federal judicial service

On July 19, 1971, Young was nominated by President Richard Nixon to a seat on the United States District Court for the District of Maryland vacated by Judge Robert Dorsey Watkins. Young was confirmed by the United States Senate on July 29, 1971, and received his commission the same day. He assumed senior status on August 1, 1987, and assumed inactive senior status on July 31, 2002. Young died on March 14, 2015, in Baltimore of complications from a fall suffered two weeks before his death.

Notes

References

Sources
 

1922 births
2015 deaths
People from Hagerstown, Maryland
Dartmouth College alumni
University of Virginia School of Law alumni
Johns Hopkins University faculty
Judges of the United States District Court for the District of Maryland
United States district court judges appointed by Richard Nixon
20th-century American judges
United States Army soldiers
United States Army personnel of World War II